In enzymology, a thetin-homocysteine S-methyltransferase is an enzyme that catalyzes the chemical reaction

dimethylsulfonioacetate + L-homocysteine  S-methylthioglycolate + L-methionine

Thus, the two substrates of this enzyme are dimethylsulfonioacetic acid and L-homocysteine, whereas its two products are S-methylthioglycolic acid and L-methionine.

This enzyme belongs to the family of transferases, specifically those transferring one-carbon group methyltransferases.  The systematic name of this enzyme class is dimethylsulfonioacetic acid:L-homocysteine S-methyltransferase. Other names in common use include dimethylthetin-homocysteine methyltransferase, and thetin-homocysteine methylpherase.

References

 
 
 

EC 2.1.1
Enzymes of unknown structure